I Am Sorry (Nepali title "आई एम सरी" I am sorry) is a 2012 Nepali film, starring Aaryan Sigdel, Keki Adhikari, Shyam Aryal, Neeta Dhungana, Keshab Bhattarai, and B.S. Rana. The film's plot focuses on two lovers: Shruti (Adhikari), a millionaire who leaves her home to get away from her hectic and busy schedule; and Guarav (Sigdel), a taxi driver who helps her find new accommodations.

The movie, released on February 10, 2012, received good initial reception. Praise was aimed at its music, cinematography, direction, story, and presentation, as well as Keki Adhikari's performance. Criticism was aimed at Aaryan Sigdel's performance, as well as some scenes including "children of remote areas of Nepal [using] English language with a taxi driver" and "a love story [being] shown in a show for orphanage".

The movie took over 18 months to complete, due to various problems during its making. The filming began during September 2010, but was halted for six months while one of the actors was in the US. Later, complications with availability of actors and set construction delayed the shoot.

The movie is the directorial debut of Dinesh Raut.

Cast
Aaryan Sigdel
Keki Adhikari
Shyam Aryal
Neeta Dhungana
Keshab Bhattarai
B.S. Rana
Bishal Sapkota

References

External links
I Am Sorry at Homecast
I Am Sorry at Films of Nepal

Nepalese drama films
2010s Nepali-language films
2012 films
2012 drama films